Sicard Flat is an unincorporated community in Yuba County, California, USA. The name honors Theodore Sicard, miner and merchant, who settled here in 1848.

References

Notes

Sources

Unincorporated communities in California
Populated places established in 1848
Unincorporated communities in Yuba County, California